Mattia Serafini (born 4 July 1983) is an Italian footballer.

Biography
Born in Fano, Marche, Serafini started his career at Vis Pesaro. After made his professional debut in the last league match of 2000–01 Serie C1 season, he left for Serie D side Riccione and played 2 seasons. On 1 July 2003 he returned to Vis Pesaro and played 39 Serie C1 matches. He left for Serie C1 side Ravenna in mid–2005, and entered the starting line–up in the 2nd season. In June 2007, he signed a 3-year contract with Serie B side AlbinoLeffe on free transfer. In the first 2 seasons, he wrote no.83 shirt then no.20 shirt and played an average of 20 league matches a season and mostly as starting XI. In 2009–10 season, he started 13 times in Serie B and left for his former club Ravenna in January.

In summer 2010 he return to AlbinoLeffe but he doesn't play any games and in January 2011 he joined Atletico Roma F.C. but played only 3 games for an injury. In summer 2011 his club did not participate in any professional league and dissolves, and so Mattia joined Prato. On 30 January 2012 he was exchanged with Daniele Morante.

Italian football scandal
On 18 June 2012 Serafini was banned for 3 years and 6 months due to 2011–12 Italian football scandal.

References

External links
 AlbinoLeffe Profile (2008–09 season) 
 La Gazzetta dello Sport Profile (2007–08 season) 
 La Gazzetta dello Sport Profile (2009–10 season) 
 Football.it Profile 
 

Italian footballers
Serie B players
Vis Pesaro dal 1898 players
A.S.D. Riccione 1929 players
Ravenna F.C. players
U.C. AlbinoLeffe players
Association football central defenders
Sportspeople from the Province of Pesaro and Urbino
1983 births
Living people
Footballers from Marche
People from Fano